Several vessels have been named Loyal Sam:
  was a merchantman launched at Bermuda. She was captured and recaptured in 1812. She also underwent several maritime incidents in 1806, 1821, and 1824. She was wrecked in 1830.
  was an iron sailing barque of  launched at Sunderland, Tyne and Wear by William Doxford & Sons. In 1880 she was renamed Canopus. She was lost in 1897.

References

Ship names